Monica Seles was the defending champion but did not compete that year.

Natasha Zvereva won in the final 6–3, 7–5 against Chanda Rubin.

Seeds
A champion seed is indicated in bold text while text in italics indicates the round in which that seed was eliminated. The top four seeds received a bye to the second round.

  Martina Navratilova (quarterfinals)
  Lindsay Davenport (quarterfinals)
  Helena Suková (second round)
  Zina Garrison-Jackson (quarterfinals)
  Magdalena Maleeva (semifinals)
  Natasha Zvereva (champion)
  Lori McNeil (semifinals)
  Ann Grossman (first round)

Draw

Final

Section 1

Section 2

External links
 1994 Virginia Slims of Chicago Draw

Ameritech Cup
1994 WTA Tour
1994 in sports in Illinois
1994 in American tennis